The Niedersächsische Symphonie-Orchester (original name:Niedersachsenorchester, later: Niedersächsisches Symphonie-Orchester) from Hanover (NSO) was founded in 1934. Chief conductor until 1938 was Fritz Lehmann.

History 
At the beginning of the 1938/39 concert season,  took over (1897–1966) and was the director of the orchestra – responsible for local and national concerts and festival performances. The first crisis in the orchestra's existence occurred in 1950, when the then Nordwestdeutscher Rundfunk Hamburg in Hanover – today's NDR Radiophilharmonie in Hanover – and the majority of the NSO's musicians switched over to broadcasting. This led to the refoundation of the orchestra under new sponsorship, consisting of the city of Hanover and the state of Lower Saxony. From then on, the new NSO took a steep ascent and was also used for Radio Bremen. In addition to Thierfelder, Rainer Koch was appointed second conductor from 1961–1965. In 1964, Thierfelder resigned from his post as principal conductor and Rudolf Alberth – coming from Munich – took over the position of principal conductor. Robert Stehli succeeded Koch as second conductor in 1965. As guest conductors, Hans Zanotelli and Franz-Paul Decker were engaged for a series of concerts. In 1968, due to lack of funds, the NSO could not continue to be sponsored by the state of Lower Saxony, and the orchestra was therefore dissolved at the end of the 1967/68 season.

Further reading  
 Heinrich Sievers: Die Musik in Hannover. Sponholtz, Hannover 1961
 Chronik: 135 Jahre Niedersachsenchor Hannover

References

External links 
 

1934 establishments in Germany
1968 disestablishments in West Germany
German symphony orchestras
Disbanded orchestras
Musical groups from Hanover
Musical groups established in 1934
Musical groups disestablished in 1968